Stichophthalma cambodia is a butterfly of the family Nymphalidae. It is found in Cambodia, Thailand and Indochina.

References

Butterflies described in 1862
Morphinae
Butterflies of Indochina